Philip Martin Wheatley CB (born 4 July 1948) is a retired British civil servant, formerly the Director-General of the National Offender Management Service and before that, Director-General of HM Prison Service.

Having attended Leeds Grammar School, Wheatley read law at the University of Sheffield, immediately joining the Prison Service as an officer in 1969 on graduation. He worked in a variety of prisons before becoming Governor of HM Prison Hull in 1986. In 1990, he moved to headquarters, where he held a variety of operational management jobs.

On 1 March 2003, he was appointed Director-General of HM Prison Service, the first Director-General to have previously been a prison officer. On 1 April 2008, the Prison Service was merged with the National Probation Service to create the National Offender Management Service (NOMS), which he subsequently led as Director-General.

On 14 June 2004, he was made a Companion of the Order of the Bath (CB) on the Queen's Birthday Honours list.

He retired in June 2010. Jack Straw, Justice Minister during Wheatley's time as Director General of NOMS, praised him as "an extraordinarily dedicated individual" with "a record of public service that is second to none". Wheatley has since taken up employment as consultant to G4S, which operates prisons and justice services in the UK and elsewhere.  His successor is Michael Spurr who was previously the Chief Operating Officer of NOMS.

Phil Wheatley is married with two children.

Employment History
 1969–70 Officer, Hatfield borstal, HM Prison Leeds;
 1970–74 Assistant governor, HM Prison Hull;
 1974–78 Training specialist, HM Prison Service College;
 1978–82 Assistant governor, HM Prison Leeds;
 1982–86 Deputy governor, HM Prison Gartree, Leicestershire;
 1986–90 Governor, HM Prison Hull;
 1990–92 HM Prison Service East Midlands area manager;
 1992–95 Assistant Director of Custody, HM Prison Service;
 1995–1999 Director of Dispersals (in charge of six highest security jails);
 1998–2003 Deputy Director-General, HM Prison Service;
 2003–2008 Director-General, HM Prison Service;
 2008–2010 Director-General, National Offender Management Service.

References

1948 births
Living people
British prison officers
British prison governors